Jamesetta Hawkins (January 25, 1938 – January 20, 2012), known professionally as Etta James, was an American singer who performed in various genres, including gospel, blues, jazz, R&B, rock and roll, and soul. Starting her career in 1954, she gained fame with hits such as "The Wallflower", "At Last", "Tell Mama", "Something's Got a Hold on Me", and "I'd Rather Go Blind". She faced a number of personal problems, including heroin addiction, severe physical abuse, and incarceration, before making a musical comeback in the late 1980s with the album Seven Year Itch.

James's deep and earthy voice bridged the gap between rhythm and blues and rock and roll. She won six Grammy Awards and 17 Blues Music Awards. She was inducted into the Rock and Roll Hall of Fame in 1993, the Grammy Hall of Fame in 1999, and the Blues Hall of Fame in 2001. She also received a Grammy lifetime achievement award in 2003. Rolling Stone magazine ranked James number 22 on its list of the 100 Greatest Singers of All Time; she was also ranked number 62 on Rolling Stone's list of the 100 Greatest Artists of All Time. Billboard 2015 list of "The 35 Greatest R&B Artists Of All Time" also included James, whose "gutsy, take-no-prisoner vocals colorfully interpreted everything from blues and R&B/soul to rock n’roll, jazz and gospel."

The Rock and Roll Hall of Fame called hers "one of the greatest voices of her century" and says she is "forever the matriarch of blues."

Life and career

1938–1959: Childhood and career beginnings
James was born on January 25, 1938, in Los Angeles, California, to Dorothy Hawkins, who was 14 at the time. Although her father has never been identified, James speculated that she was the daughter of pool player Rudolf "Minnesota Fats" Wanderone, whom she met briefly in 1987. Her mother was frequently absent from their apartment in Watts, conducting relationships with various men, and James lived with a series of foster parents, most notably "Sarge" and "Mama" Lu. James referred to her mother as "the Mystery Lady".

James received her first professional vocal training at the age of five from James Earle Hines, musical director of the Echoes of Eden choir at the St. Paul Baptist Church in South-Central Los Angeles. Hines abused James while she was under his tutelage; he often punched her in the chest while she sang to force her voice to come from her gut. She quickly became known for having an unusually strong voice for a child her age.

Sarge, like the musical director for the choir, was also abusive. During drunken poker games at home, he would awaken James in the early morning hours and force her with beatings to sing for his friends. The trauma of her foster father forcing her to sing under these humiliating circumstances caused her to have difficulties with singing on demand throughout her career.

James frequently performed in Nashville's famed R&B clubs on the so-called "Chitlin' Circuit" in the 1940s, 50s, and 60s.

In 1950, Mama Lu died, and James's biological mother took her to the Fillmore district of San Francisco. Within a couple of years, she began listening to doo-wop and was inspired to form a girl group, the Creolettes (so named for the members' light-skinned complexions).

At the age of 14, she met musician Johnny Otis. Stories on how they met vary. In Otis's version, she came to his hotel after one of his performances in the city and persuaded him to audition her. Another story was that Otis spotted the Creolettes performing at a Los Angeles nightclub and sought for them to record his "answer song" to Hank Ballard's "Work with Me, Annie". Otis took the Creolettes under his wing and helped them sign to Modern Records, at which point they changed their name to Peaches. At this time Otis also gave James her stage name, transposing "Jamesetta" (her given first name) into "Etta James." In 1954, James recorded and was credited as co-author for "The Wallflower" (a title change to the aforementioned song, "Work with Me, Annie"), which was released in early 1955. The original title of the song was actually "Roll with Me, Henry", but it had been changed to avoid censorship at the time (roll implying sexual activity). In February 1955, the song reached number one on the Hot Rhythm & Blues Tracks chart. Its success also gave the Peaches an opening spot on Little Richard's national tour.

While James was on tour with Richard, pop singer Georgia Gibbs recorded a version of her song and released it under the again-altered title "Dance With Me, Henry." It became a crossover hit, reaching number one on the Billboard Hot 100, which angered James.

After leaving the Peaches, James had another R&B hit with "Good Rockin' Daddy" but struggled with follow-ups. When her contract with Modern came up for renewal in 1960, she signed a contract with Chess Records instead, with which she would go on to become one of the label's earliest stars. Around this time, she became involved in a relationship with the singer Harvey Fuqua, the founder of the doo-wop group the Moonglows.

Musician Bobby Murray toured with James for over 20 years. He wrote that James had her first hit single when she was 15 years old and went steady with B.B. King when she was 16. James believed that King's hit single "Sweet Sixteen" was about her. In early 1955, she and an aspiring singer, the 19-year-old Elvis Presley, then recording for Sun Studios and an avid fan of King's, shared a bill in a large club just outside Memphis. In her autobiography, she noted how impressed she was with the young singer's manners. She also recalled how happy he made her many years later when she found out that it was Presley who had moved her close friend Jackie Wilson from a substandard convalescent home to a more appropriate facility and, as she put it, paid all the expenses. Presley died a year later. Wilson went on to live for another ten years in the care center Presley found for him.

 1960–1978: Chess and Warner Brothers years 
Dueting with Harvey Fuqua, James recorded for Argo Records (later renamed Cadet Records), a label established by Chess. Her first hit singles with Fuqua were "If I Can't Have You" and "Spoonful". Her first solo hit was the doo-wop–styled rhythm-and-blues song "All I Could Do Was Cry", which was a number two R&B hit. Chess Records co-founder Leonard Chess envisioned James as a classic ballad stylist who had potential to cross over to the pop charts and soon surrounded the singer with violins and other string instruments. The first string-laden ballad James recorded was "My Dearest Darling" in May 1960, which peaked in the top five of the R&B chart. James sang background vocals for her labelmate Chuck Berry on his "Back in the U.S.A."

Her debut album, At Last!, was released in late 1960 and was noted for its varied selection of music, from jazz standards to blues to doo-wop and rhythm and blues (R&B). The album included the future classics "I Just Want to Make Love to You" and "A Sunday Kind of Love". In early 1961, James released what was to become her signature song, "At Last", a Glenn Miller tune, which reached number two on the R&B chart and number 47 on the Billboard Hot 100. Though the record was not as successful as expected, her rendition has become the best-known version of the song. James followed this with "Trust in Me", which also included string instruments. Later that same year (1960), James released a second studio album, The Second Time Around. The album took the same direction as her first, covering jazz and pop standards and with strings on many of the songs. It produced two hit singles, "Fool That I Am" and "Don't Cry Baby".

James started adding gospel elements in her music the following year, releasing "Something's Got a Hold on Me", which peaked at number four on the R&B chart and was a Top 40 pop hit. That success was quickly followed by "Stop the Wedding", which reached number six on the R&B chart and also had gospel elements. In 1963, she had another major hit with "Pushover" and released the live album Etta James Rocks the House, recorded at the New Era Club in Nashville, Tennessee. After a couple of years of minor hits, James's career started to suffer after 1965. After a period of isolation, she returned to recording in 1967 and reemerged with more gutsy R&B numbers thanks to her recording at the legendary FAME Studios in Muscle Shoals, Alabama. These sessions yielded her comeback hit "Tell Mama", co-written by Clarence Carter, which reached number ten on the R&B chart and number twenty-three for pop. An album of the same name was also released that year and included her take on Otis Redding's "Security". The B-side of "Tell Mama" was "I'd Rather Go Blind", which became a blues classic and has been recorded by many other artists. In her autobiography, Rage to Survive, she wrote that she heard the song outlined by her friend Ellington "Fugi" Jordan when she visited him in prison. According to her account, she wrote the rest of the song with Jordan but for tax reasons gave her songwriting credit to her partner at the time, Billy Foster.

Following this success, James became an in-demand concert performer, though she never again reached the heyday of her early to mid-1960s success. Her records continued to chart in the R&B Top 40 in the early 1970s, with singles such as "Losers Weepers" (1970) and "I Found a Love" (1972). Though James continued to record for Chess, she was devastated by the death of record executive Leonard Chess in 1969. James ventured into rock and funk with the release of her self-titled album in 1973, with production from the famed rock producer Gabriel Mekler, who had worked with Steppenwolf and Janis Joplin. Joplin had admired James and had covered "Tell Mama" in concert. James' 1973 album, exhibiting a mixture of musical styles, was nominated for a Grammy Award. The album did not produce any major hits, however, and neither did the follow-up album, Come a Little Closer, in 1974, though, like '73's Etta James before it, the album was also critically acclaimed.

In 1975, James opened up for comedian Richard Pryor at the Shubert Theatre in Los Angeles.

James continued to record for Chess (now owned by All Platinum Records), releasing one more album in 1976, Etta Is Betta Than Evvah!  Her 1978 album Deep in the Night, produced by Jerry Wexler for Warner Bros., incorporated more rock-based music in her repertoire. That same year, James was the opening act for the Rolling Stones and performed at the Montreux Jazz Festival. Following this brief success, however, she left Chess Records and did not record for another ten years while she struggled with drug addiction and alcoholism.

 1982–2012: Later career 

James continued to perform on occasion in the early 1980s, including two guest appearances at Grateful Dead concerts in December 1982. and was a guest on John Mayall's Blues Breakers 1982 reunion show in New Jersey.In 1984, she contacted David Wolper and asked to perform in the opening ceremony of the 1984 Summer Olympics, at which she sang "When the Saints Go Marching In". In 1987, she performed "Rock and Roll Music" with Chuck Berry in the documentary film Hail! Hail! Rock 'n' Roll.

In 1989, she signed with Island Records and with them released the albums Seven Year Itch and Stickin' to My Guns, both of which were produced by Barry Beckett and recorded at FAME Studios. Also in 1989 James was filmed in a concert at the Wiltern Theater in Los Angeles with Joe Walsh and Albert Collins for the film Jazzvisions: Jump the Blues Away. Many of the backing musicians were top-flight players from Los Angeles: Rick Rosas (bass), Michael Huey (drums), Ed Sanford (Hammond B3 organ), Kip Noble (piano) and Josh Sklair, James' longtime guitar player.

James participated with the rap singer Def Jef on the song "Droppin' Rhymes on Drums", which mixed James's jazz vocals with hip-hop. In 1992, she recorded the album The Right Time, produced by Jerry Wexler for Elektra Records. She was inducted into the Rock and Roll Hall of Fame in 1993.

James signed with Private Music Records in 1993 and recorded a Billie Holiday tribute album, Mystery Lady: Songs of Billie Holiday. The album set a trend of incorporating more jazz elements in James's music. The album won James her first Grammy Award, for Best Jazz Vocal Performance, Female, in 1994. In 1995, her autobiography, A Rage to Survive, co-written with David Ritz, was published. Also in 1995, she recorded the album Time After Time. A Christmas album, Etta James Christmas, was released in 1998.

By the mid-1990s, James's earlier music—by now considered classic—was being used in commercials, including "I Just Wanna Make Love to You," for example. After an excerpt of that song was featured in a Diet Coke advertising campaign in the UK, the song again charted, reaching the top ten on the UK charts in 1996.

By 1998, with the release of Life, Love & the Blues, James had added as backing musicians her own sons, Donto and Sametto, on drums and bass, respectively. They were part of her touring band. She continued recording for Private Music, which released the blues album Matriarch of the Blues in 2000, on which she returned to her R&B roots.

 Performance Legacy 
In 2001, she was inducted into the Blues Hall of Fame and the Rockabilly Hall of Fame, the latter for her contributions to the developments of both rock and roll and rockabilly. In 2003, she received a Grammy Lifetime Achievement Award. On her 2004 release, Blue Gardenia, she returned to a jazz style. Her final album for Private Music, Let's Roll, released in 2005, won the Grammy Award for Best Contemporary Blues Album.

In 2004, Rolling Stone magazine ranked her number 62 on its list of the 100 Greatest Artists of All Time.

James performed at the top jazz festivals in the world, such as the Montreux Jazz Festival in 1977, 1989, 1990 and 1993. She performed nine times at the legendary Monterey Jazz Festival and five times at the San Francisco Jazz Festival. She performed at the Playboy Jazz Festival in 1990, 1997, 2004, and 2007. She performed six times at the North Sea Jazz Festival, in 1978, 1982, 1989, 1990, 1991 and 1993. She performed at the New Orleans Jazz & Heritage Festival in 2006 and 2009 (prior 2012 credit - after date of death). She also often performed at free summer arts festivals throughout the United States.

In 2008, James was portrayed by Beyoncé Knowles in the film Cadillac Records, a fictional account of Chess Records, James's label for 18 years, about how label founder and producer Leonard Chess helped the careers of James and others. The film included "At Last," performed by Beyonce. James would go on to publicly criticize Beyonce, who was invited to perform the song at Barack Obama's inaugural ball, but later added that her critical remarks were meant to be received as a joke and stemmed from personal hurt over not having been invited to the sing the song herself for the Obama inauguration. It was later reported that Alzheimer's disease and "drug-induced dementia" had contributed to her negative comments about Knowles.

In April 2009, at the age of 71, James made her final television appearance, performing "At Last" on the program Dancing with the Stars. In May 2009, she received the Soul/Blues Female Artist of the Year award from the Blues Foundation, the ninth time she won that award. She carried on touring but by 2010 had to cancel concert dates because of her gradually failing health; by this time she was suffering from dementia and leukemia. In November 2011, James released her final album, The Dreamer, which was critically acclaimed upon its release. She announced that this would be her final album.

James' enduring relevance was affirmed in 2011 when the late Swedish DJ Avicii achieved substantial chart success with the song "Levels", which samples her 1962 song "Something's Got a Hold on Me". The same sample was used by the east coast rapper Flo Rida in his 2011 hit single "Good Feeling". Both artists issued statements of condolence upon James's death. James' original classic music again charted after these 21st-century re-interpretations.

Style and influence
James possessed the vocal range of a contralto. Her musical style changed during the course of her career. At the beginning of her recording career, in the mid-1950s, James was marketed as an R&B and doo-wop singer. After signing with Chess Records in 1960, James broke through as a traditional pop-styled singer, covering jazz and pop music standards on her debut album, At Last! James's voice deepened and coarsened, moving her musical style in her later years into the genres of soul and jazz.

James was once considered one of the most overlooked blues and R&B musicians in the music history of the United States. It was not until the early 1990s, when she began receiving major industry awards from the Grammys and the Blues Foundation, that she received wide recognition. In more recent years, she has been hailed as a pioneer who helped bridge the gap between rhythm and blues and rock and roll and thereby contributed significantly to American musical history. James has influenced a wide variety of musicians, including, notably, Diana Ross, Christina Aguilera, Janis Joplin, Brandy, Bonnie Raitt, Shemekia Copeland, Beth Hart, Hayley Williams of Paramore and Brent Smith of Shinedown as well as British artists The Rolling Stones, Elkie Brooks, Paloma Faith, Joss Stone, Rita Ora, Amy Winehouse, and Adele, and the Belgian singer Dani Klein.

In particular, her song "Something's Got a Hold on Me" has been recognized in many ways. Brussels music act Vaya Con Dios covered the song on their 1990 album Night Owls. Another version, performed by Christina Aguilera, was in the 2010 film Burlesque. Pretty Lights sampled the song in "Finally Moving", followed by Avicii's dance hit "Levels", and again in Flo Rida's single "Good Feeling".

Personal life

Islam
James knew Malcolm X and was a member of the Nation of Islam for around 10 years, taking the name Jamesetta X.

 Marriage and children 
James was married to Artis Mills from 1969 until her death in 2012.

James had two sons, Donto James and Sametto James, born to different fathers. Both were musicians and eventually performed professionally with their mother; Donto played drums at Montreux in 1993, and Sametto played bass guitar circa 2003, among other performances and tours.

 Legal difficulties and drug addiction 
By the mid-1960s, James was addicted to heroin. She bounced checks, forged prescriptions and stole from her friends to finance her addiction. James was arrested in 1966 for writing bad checks. She was placed on probation and ordered to pay a $500 fine. In 1969, she spent 10 days in jail for violating probation.

James encountered a string of legal problems during the early 1970s due to her heroin addiction. She was continuously in and out of rehabilitation centers, including the Tarzana Treatment Centers, in Los Angeles, California. Her husband Artis Mills accepted responsibility when they were both arrested for heroin possession, and served a 10-year prison sentence. He was released from prison in 1981.

In 1973, James was arrested for possession of heroin. In 1974, James was sentenced to drug treatment instead of serving time in prison. During this period, she became addicted to methadone and would mix her doses with heroin. She was in the Tarzana Psychiatric Hospital for 17 months, starting at the age of 36, and went through a great struggle at the start of treatment. In her 1995 autobiography A Rage to Survive, she said that the time she spent in the hospital changed her life. After leaving treatment, however, her substance abuse continued, particularly after she developed a relationship with a man who was also using drugs.

In 2010, James received treatment for a dependency on painkillers.

 Illness and death 

James was hospitalized in January 2010 to treat an infection caused by MRSA, a bacterium resistant to many antibiotics. During her hospitalization, her son Donto revealed to the public that she had been previously diagnosed with Alzheimer's disease in 2008.

James was diagnosed with leukemia in early 2011. The illness became terminal, and her husband Artis Mills was appointed sole conservator of the James estate and to oversee her medical care. She died on January 20, 2012, five days before her 74th birthday, at Riverside Community Hospital in Riverside, California. Her death came three days after that of Johnny Otis, the man who had discovered her in the 1950s. Thirty-six days after her death, her sideman Red Holloway also died.

Her funeral was presided over by the Reverend Al Sharpton and took place in Gardena, California eight days after her death. Stevie Wonder and Christina Aguilera gave musical tributes. She was buried at Inglewood Park Cemetery in Los Angeles County, California.

Discography

Studio albums

 At Last! (1960) 
 The Second Time Around (1961) 
 Etta James (1962) 
 Etta James Sings for Lovers (1962) 
 Etta James Top Ten (1963) 
 The Queen of Soul (1965) 
 Call My Name (1966) 
 Tell Mama (1968)
 Etta James Sings Funk (1970)
 Losers Weepers (1971)
 Etta James (1973)
 Come a Little Closer (1974)
 Etta Is Betta Than Evvah! (1976)
 Deep in the Night (1978)
 Changes (1980)
 Seven Year Itch (1988)
 Stickin' to My Guns (1990)
 The Right Time (1992)
 Mystery Lady: Songs of Billie Holiday (1994)
 Time After Time (1995)
 Love's Been Rough on Me (1997)
 Life, Love & the Blues (1998)
 Heart of a Woman (1999)
 Matriarch of the Blues (2000)
 Blue Gardenia (2001)
 Let's Roll (2003)
 Blues to the Bone (2004)
 All the Way (2006)
 The Dreamer (2011)

Awards
Since 1989 (notably rather late in her career, after nearly thirty years of prior recording), James has received over 30 awards and recognitions from eight different organizations, including the Rock and Roll Hall of Fame and Museum and the National Academy of Recording Arts and Sciences which organizes the Grammys.

In 1989, the newly formed Rhythm and Blues Foundation included James in their first Pioneer Awards for artists whose "lifelong contributions have been instrumental in the development of Rhythm & Blues music". The following year, 1990, she received an NAACP Image Award, which is given for "outstanding achievements and performances of people of color in the arts;" it was an award she cherished as it "was coming from my own people". In 2020, James was inducted into the National Rhythm & Blues Hall of Fame.
In 1993, James was inducted into the Rock and Roll Hall of Fame
In 2001, James was inducted into the Rockabilly Hall of Fame
In 2003, James received a star on the Hollywood Walk of Fame at 7080 Hollywood Blvd
In 2005, James was inducted into Hollywood's Rockwalk
In 2006, James received the Billboard R&B Founders Award

Grammys
The Grammy Awards are awarded annually by the National Academy of Recording Arts and Sciences. James has received six Grammy Awards. Her first was in 1995, when she was awarded Best Jazz Vocal Performance for the album Mystery Lady, which consisted of covers of Billie Holiday songs. Two other albums have also won awards, Let's Roll (Best Contemporary Blues Album) in 2003, and Blues to the Bone (Best Traditional Blues Album) in 2004. Two of her early songs have been given Grammy Hall of Fame Awards for "qualitative or historical significance": "At Last", in 1999, and "The Wallflower (Dance with Me, Henry)" in 2008. In 2003, she was given the Grammy Lifetime Achievement Award.

|-
| style="text-align:center;"| || All I Could Do Was Cry || Best Rhythm & Blues Performance || 
|-
| style="text-align:center;"| ||Fool That I Am || Best Rhythm & Blues Performance || 
|-
| style="text-align:center;"| ||Tell Mama|rowspan="4" | Best R&B Solo Vocal Performance, Female || 
|-
| style="text-align:center;"| ||Security || 
|-
| style="text-align:center;"| ||Etta James || 
|-
| style="text-align:center;"| ||St. Louis Blues || 
|-
| style="text-align:center;"| ||Seven Year Itch|rowspan="3"| Best Contemporary Blues Recording || 
|-
| style="text-align:center;"| ||Stickin' to My Guns || 
|-
| style="text-align:center;"| || The Right Time|| 
|-
| style="text-align:center;"| ||Mystery Lady: Songs of Billie Holiday || Best Jazz Vocal Performance || 
|-
| style="text-align:center;" rowspan="2"| ||At Last|| Grammy Hall of Fame Award ||
|-
| Life, Love & the Blues || Best Contemporary Blues Album || 
|-
| style="text-align:center;"| ||Heart of a Woman || Best Jazz Vocal Performance || 
|-
| style="text-align:center;"| ||Matriarch of the Blues ||Best Contemporary Blues Album || 
|-
| style="text-align:center;"| ||Etta James ||Grammy Lifetime Achievement Award ||
|-
| style="text-align:center;"| ||Let's Roll || Best Contemporary Blues Album || 
|-
| style="text-align:center;"| ||Blues to the Bone || Best Traditional Blues Album || 
|-
| style="text-align:center;"| ||The Wallflower|| Grammy Hall of Fame Award ||

Blues Foundation
The members of the Blues Foundation, a nonprofit organization set up in Memphis, Tennessee, to foster the blues and its heritage, have nominated James for a Blues Music Award nearly every year since its founding in 1980; and she received some form of Blues Female Artist of the Year award 14 times since 1989, continuously from 1999 to 2007. Her albums Life, Love, & the Blues (1999), Burnin' Down the House (2003), and Let's Roll (2004) were awarded Soul/Blues Album of the Year, and in 2001 she was inducted into the Blues Hall of Fame.

Books
 Rage To Survive: The Etta James Story (2003) by David Ritz with Etta James 
 American Legends: The Life of Etta James (2014) by Charles River Editors, 

References

Sources
Gulla, Bob (2007). Icons of R&B and Soul, Vol. 1. Greenwood Press. .
James, Etta; Ritz, David (1998). Rage to Survive: The Etta James Story. Da Capo Press. .

External links

 Tim Jonze, "Etta James, blues icon, dies aged 73", The Guardian'', January 20, 2012.
 

 
1938 births
2012 deaths
African-American women singer-songwriters
American blues singers
American contraltos
American memoirists
American people of Swiss descent
American soul singers
Argo Records artists
Cadet Records artists
Chess Records artists
Deaths from cancer in California
Deaths from leukemia
Elektra Records artists
Former Nation of Islam members
Grammy Lifetime Achievement Award winners
Island Records artists
Kent Records artists
Modern Records artists
Musicians from Los Angeles
Private Music artists
RCA Victor artists
Soul-blues musicians
Traditional pop music singers
Verve Records artists
Virgin Records artists
West Coast blues musicians
21st-century African-American women singers
20th-century African-American women singers
Singer-songwriters from California